Prairie River may refer to:

Rivers in the United States

 Prairie River, in Louisiana, a tributary of Bayou Pierre
 Prairie River (Michigan), a tributary of the St. Joseph River
 Prairie River (Big Sandy Lake), in Minnesota
 Prairie River (Mississippi River tributary), in Minnesota
 Prairie River (Wisconsin), a tributary of the Wisconsin River

Other uses
 Prairie River, Saskatchewan, Canada, a hamlet
 Prairie River station, now Prairie River Museum
 Prairie River, an Intel ASIC for the Omni-Path architecture

See also 
 Long Prairie River, a tributary of the Crow Wing River in Minnesota, US
 Prairie Rivers Network, an American nonprofit organization
 Rivière des Prairies, a delta channel of the Ottawa River in Quebec, Canada